Kałyški is a village in the Liozna District of Vitebsk Region, Belarus. It is located near the Belarusian-Russian border.

Notable residents 

 Rabbi Avraham Kalisker (1741–1810), Hasidic leader
 Yefim Fomin (1909-1941), Soviet political commissar
 Solomon Nezlin (1892-1990), Soviet tuberculosis scientist

References 

Populated places in Vitebsk Region
Shtetls
Villages in Belarus